Austria competed at the 1980 Summer Paralympics in Arnhem, Netherlands. 48 competitors from Austria won 45 medals including 14 gold, 23 silver and 8 bronze and finished 11th in the medal table.

See also 
 Austria at the Paralympics
 Austria at the 1980 Summer Olympics

References 

Austria at the Paralympics
1980 in Austrian sport
Nations at the 1980 Summer Paralympics